Prehistoric fiction is a literary genre in which the story is set in the period of time prior to the existence of written record, known as prehistory.  As a fictional genre, the realistic description of the subject varies, without necessarily a commitment to develop an objective anthropological account. Because of this, it is possible that the author of prehistoric fiction deals with his subject with much more freedom than the author of a historical fiction, and the genre also has connections with speculative fiction. In many narratives, humans and dinosaurs live together, despite the extinction of the dinosaurs and the evolution of humans being separated by millions of years. The paleontologist Björn Kurtén coined the term "paleofiction" to define his works.

One of the derivatives of cyberpunk is stonepunk, a subgenre of science fiction. Stonepunk is a neologism born from the contraction between a stone and cyberpunk. This is an uchronia  that refers to the massive use of technology in prehistoric times.

List of prehistoric fiction

Print

Novels and series

Shaman (2013) by Kim Stanley Robinson
Evolution (2003) by Stephen Baxter
The Books of the Named
Chronicles of Ancient Darkness (2004–2009) by Michelle Paver 
The Clan of the Cave Bear (1980) by Jean M. Auel 
The Cave Boy of the Age of Stone (1907) by Margaret A. McIntyre 
Dance of the Tiger (1978) by Björn Kurtén 
Darkwing (2007) by Kenneth Oppel 
The Eternal Lover (1913) by Edgar Rice Burroughs
The Inheritors
The Mammoth Trilogy
Mists of Dawn
The Land That Time Forgot (1918) by Edgar Rice Burroughs 
The People That Time Forgot (1918) by Edgar Rice Burroughs 
Out of Time's Abyss (1918) by Edgar Rice Burroughs 
The Quest for Fire (1911) by J.-H. Rosny aîné
Raptor Red
Sambaqui: A Novel of Pre-History (1975) by Stella Carr Ribeiro
Saga of Pliocene Exile by Julian May
The Scorpion God (two of its three short stories are set in pre-history)
The Story of Ab (1897) by Stanley Waterloo
A Story of the Stone Age (1897) by H. G. Wells

Short fiction
Paris Before Man (1861) by Pierre Boitard
Spear and Fang (1925) by Robert E. Howard

Comics

 Prehistoric Peeps (1893) by Edward Tennyson
Alley Oop series (1932–present) by V. T. Hamlin and others
Anthro
Devil Dinosaur by Jack Kirby
Rahan series (1969-2010) by Roger Lécureux, André Chéret and Jean-François Lécureux
Tor series (1953-1993) by Joe Kubert
The Cavern Clan series, Mauricio de Sousa and others (1961–present), graphic novels include Piteco - Ingá, by Shiko and Piteco - Fogo, by Eduardo Ferigato.

Film, television, and video 

10,000 BC (2008)
Ao: The Last Hunter (2010)
The Flintstones (1960-1966)
Iceman (2017) 
Korg: 70,000 B.C. (1974-1975)
Mighty Mightor (1967-1968)
Quest for Fire (1981)
One Million B.C. (1940)
One Million Years B.C. (1966)
Alpha (2018)
Primal (2019)

Games

Tabletop
 Cavemaster 
GURPS Ice Age
Planegea
Stone Age
 Würm
 Wolf-Packs and Winter Snow

Video 
Far Cry: Primal
UnReal World
Roots of Pacha
NetHack

See also 

 Ancient astronauts in popular culture
Caveman
 Historical fiction
 Lost World (genre)
Stonepunk

Further reading
 Ruddick, Nicholas. The Fire in the Stone: Prehistoric Fiction from Charles Darwin to Jean M. Auel. Middletown, CT. Wesleyan University Press, 2009.

References

External links
Prehistoric Fiction
Reader's Corner's page
Prehistoric SF at The Encyclopedia of Science Fiction – with linked entries on "Origin of Man" and related themes
Novels Set in Prehistoric Times and Time-Sweep Novels
Entre pédagogie et parodie, la préhistoire dans la bande dessinée francophone  

Literary genres
 
 
Science fiction themes
Speculative fiction